McKay Reservoir is a reservoir in Umatilla County of the U.S. state of Oregon. It is an impoundment of McKay Creek, a tributary of the Umatilla River. The reservoir and land that immediately surrounds it are designated as the McKay Creek National Wildlife Refuge. The reservoir and creek that it impounds are named for Dr. William C. McKay. McKay was an early settler in the Pendleton, Oregon area. He settled near the mouth of McKay Creek about 1851. The place was originally called Houtama. He died in Pendleton in 1893.

Hydrology 
The McKay Dam was built between 1923–1927 as a project of the United States Bureau of Reclamation, part of the Umatilla Basin Project that had started in 1908 with the nearby Cold Springs Dam.  It furnishes supplementary water to Stanfield and Westland Irrigation Districts.

The McKay Dam is an impoundment of McKay Creek, a tributary of the Umatilla River. The spillway section of the McKay Dam was modified 1978 through 1979 to increase the capacity from 10,000 to 27,000 cubic feet per second.

Natural history
The reservoir is jointly managed by the Bureau of Reclamation and the McKay Creek National Wildlife Refuge for irrigation water and a habitat for a variety wildlife including osprey, bald eagles, and an abundance of waterfowl. Fishing is permitted between March thorough September. McKay’s shallow water marshes and wetlands are also productive for warmwater fish such as rainbow trout, crappie, largemouth bass, sunfish, and yellow perch, as well as brown bullhead catfish, and lesser numbers of largemouth and smallmouth bass.

See also
 List of lakes in Oregon
McKay, Oregon
McKay Creek National Wildlife Refuge
Pendleton, Oregon

References

External links
Oregon Water Quality Index Report for the Umatilla Basin Oregon Department of Environmental Quality
McKay Creek National Wildlife Refuge U.S. Fish and Wildlife Service

Reservoirs in Oregon
Historic American Engineering Record in Oregon
Lakes of Umatilla County, Oregon
Buildings and structures in Umatilla County, Oregon
Protected areas of Umatilla County, Oregon
Dams in Oregon
United States Bureau of Reclamation dams
Dams completed in 1927
1927 establishments in Oregon